Carl Fischer may refer to:

 Carl Fischer (actor) (1876–1953), Danish actor
 Carl Fischer (baseball) (1905–1963), American baseball player
 Carl Fischer (trumpeter), American trumpeter, trombonist and saxophonist of the Billy Joel Band
 Carl Fischer (tennis), American tennis player from the 1920s and 30s
 Carl Fischer (homeopath) (died 1893), New Zealand doctor, homoeopath and viticulturalist
 Carl Fischer Music, American music publishing company
 Carl Anthony Fisher (1945–1993), Roman Catholic bishop
 Carl G. Fisher (1874–1939), American entrepreneur
 Carl H. Fischer (1907–2005), American floriculturalist
 Carl T. Fischer (1912–1954), Native American jazz pianist and composer

See also 
 Karl Fischer (disambiguation)

Fischer, Carl